Troides andromache, the Borneo birdwing , is a species of butterfly in the family Papilionidae. It is found only in Borneo.

Description

The wingspan ranges from 150 to 180 mm (female), the hindwings are discreetly scalloped. The body is black with yellow marks on the ventral abdomen. Troides andromache is sexually dimorphic.

The males have black upperside forewings. The underside of the forewings is black marked, in the postdiscal area and between the veins, with white. The hindwings are yellow with black veins and have a border of marginal black triangles.

The females have white forewings with black veins lined with grey. The black veined yellow hindwings have wide-bordered black margin and a wide submarginal formed of confluent black spots.

Subspecies
The subspecies are
Troides andromache andromache northern Borneo, Sabah
Troides andromache marapokensis Fruhstorfer, 1899 northern Borneo, northern Sarawak
Troides andromache nishikawai Kobayashi, 1992 western Borneo

Biology
The host plants for the caterpillar are Aristolochia - A. acuminata and A. foveolata.

Biotope
Troides andromache is found in rain forest canopy in the mountains of Borneo at an elevation of 1,000to 2,900 m.

Etymology
In Greek mythology, Andromache (/ænˈdrɒməkiː/; ancient Greek: Ἀνδρομάχη) was the wife of Hector and daughter of Eetion.

Related species
Troides andromache is a member of the Troides amphrysus species group. The members of this clade are:

Troides amphrysus (Cramer, [1779])
Troides andromache (Staudinger, 1892)
Troides cuneifera (Oberthür, 1879)
Troides miranda (Butler, 1869)

See also
 Sundaland

References

D'Abrera, B. (1975) Birdwing Butterflies of the World. Country Life Books, London.
Haugum, J. & Low, A.M. 1978–1985. A Monograph of the Birdwing Butterflies. 2 volumes. Scandinavian Press, Klampenborg; 663 pp.
Staudinger, O. 1892 Ornithoptera andromache n. Sp. Deut. ent. Zeit. [Iris] 5:393-394.
Kurt Rumbucher,Béla von Knötgen and Oliver Schäffler, Knötgen 1999 Part 7, Papilionidae IV. Troides II., amphrysus-group in Erich Bauer and Thomas Frankenbach Eds. Butterflies of the World. Keltern: Goecke & Evers .

External links

ARKive Photo and more information.
Butterflycorner Images from Naturhistorisches Museum Wien (English/German)
Nagypal
Borneo Montane Rain Forests Ecoregion

Andromache
Butterflies of Borneo
Endemic fauna of Borneo
Taxonomy articles created by Polbot
Butterflies described in 1892